Het Zand is a hamlet in the Dutch province of Utrecht, in the municipality of Utrecht.

Populated places in Utrecht (province)